Gustavo Romano is a Buenos Aires-born contemporary artist who works in a variety of media including actions, installations, net art, video and photography. 
He uses media and technology devices as well as objects belonging to people's daily lives, decontextualizing them and trying to force viewers to think about their routines and preconceptions.
He won the Platinum Konex Award from Argentina in 2002, and the Guggenheim Fellowship in 2006. He lives and works in Madrid.

Projects

One of his projects is Time Notes, which consists of performances of a series of actions using a new money system designed by Romano, with bills based on units of time (bills of 60 minutes, 5 years, etc.). One of those actions is the Lost Time Refund Office, where officers ask people who are passing by how have they lost their time and refund it with a time bill, at the same time creating a classification and a database of the losses. Since 2004, Romano has performed this piece on the streets of cities including Berlin, Singapore, Rostock, Vigo, Buenos Aires, Mexico, San Jose, Silicon Valley, Munich, and Madrid.

On 2009 he started the project called Psychoeconomy! an artistic platform for discussion and research, proposing an alternative approach on various global issues. Each edition involves an artist’s meeting, a public event and the publication of the resulting conclusions, documents, texts and graphic materials. The first edition was the Corporate Summit 2010, proposed in order to discuss the international financial crisis and prevailing monetary exchange systems. Four artists (CEOs of their own fake corporations), read the Madrid Declaration, at Matadero Madrid. The artists were Daniel García Andújar, Fran Ilich, Georg Zoche and Gustavo Romano.

Exhibitions

He has participated in several international events like Videonale 11, Bonn (2007), the I Biennial of the End of the World, Ushuaia, Argentina (2007), the I Singapore Biennale (2006), the VII Havana Biennial (2000), the II Biennial of Porto Alegre, Brazil (1999), and the I Biennial of Lima (1997).

He has participated in new media and art in public space festivals such as Madrid Abierto (2009–2010), Transitio MX, Mexico (2007); Transmediale, Berlin (2003); Videobrasil (2005) and FILE (2001), São Paulo; Interferences (2000), Montbéliard; and Ars Electronica (1997), Vienna.

In 2008, he presented “Sabotaje en la Máquina Abstracta”(Sabotage in the Abstract Machine), a ten years’ anthological solo show at the MEIAC of Badajoz, Spain. 
He has also had solo exhibitions at the Museum of Modern Art of Buenos Aires, the Ruth Benzacar Gallery, Tamayo Museum, Mexico DF, among others.

Curatorial projects
In 1996 Romano started and developed the virtual space Fin del Mundo (The End of the World), which provides a platform for the circulation of net art projects by Argentinean artists. It was the first of a kind in Latin-America.

He was the initiator of LIMbØ, an independent media lab that started in 2002 with the cooperation of the MAMBA (Museum of Modern Art of Buenos Aires).

He was the curator of the Virtual Space of the Cultural Center of Spain in Buenos Aires. He started and directed the MediaLab of this institution as well.

From 2004 to 2009, he was the director of the Medialab and the curator of the Virtual Space of the Cultural Center of Spain in Buenos Aires.

Since 2008, Romano has been the curator of NETescopio, an archive of net art projects for the MEIAC, of Badajoz, Spain.

In 2018 he was guest curator at The New Art Fest, a Lisbon-based art and technology festival.

References

External links 
 www.gustavoromano.com.ar
 www.timenoteshouse.org
 www.psychoeconomy.org
 www.findelmundo.com.ar
 netescopio.meiac.es/

Argentine contemporary artists
New media artists
Living people
Year of birth missing (living people)